Alexei Kosygin (1904–1980) was a Soviet Premier.

Kosygin may also refer to:
 Kosygin Moscow State Textile University

People with the surname
 Yuri Kosygin, a character in Oz

See also
 Kosygin reform or the 1965 Soviet economic reform
 1979 Soviet economic reform or Kosygin reform